Caitlin Lewis (born 16 November 1999) is a Welsh Rugby Union player who plays wing for the Wales women's national rugby union team, Scarlets Region and Exeter Chiefs. She made her debut for the Wales national squad in 2020 against Spain and represented them at the 2021 Women's Six Nations Championship.

Early career 
Lewis was born in Ammanford and attended Ysgol Dyffryn Aman. She is currently a student in Cardiff Metropolitan University.

Caitlin began to play rugby at the age of 15 at Ysgol Dyffryn Aman alongside fellow Welsh Player Hannah Jones. Caitlin was involved in the schools’ rugby team that won the Rosslyn Park HSBC National School 7s Tournament three years consecutively. Caitlin then became involved with the regional girls set up in Wales playing for Scarlets U18’s and Wales 7’s U18s. Caitlin represented Wales at the Bahamas 2017 Commonwealth Youth Games in Rugby Sevens winning a bronze medal.

Caitlin began to attend Cardiff Metropolitan University in September 2018 to study BSc Performance Analysis. Caitlin signed to Worcester Warriors and made a couple of appearances at Sixways Stadium. Caitlin has also been a regular face in the Senior Scarlets Women’s Squad since turning 18. Caitlin in now studying a MSc in Sports Media and Broadcast at Cardiff Metropolitan University and has recently signed to Exeter Chiefs.

Club career 
Lewis plays rugby for her university team at Cardiff Metropolitan. She also represents Scarlets and has played for Worcester Warriors.

International career 
Lewis represented the Wales under-18s squad at the 2017 Youth Commonwealth Games in the Bahamas, where the team won bronze. She then went on to play for the Wales Women's Development team at the following Dubai sevens invitational tournament.

Lewis made her first start for the Women's Six Nations squad in 2020, and notably scored a last-minute touchdown during the team's 2021 Six Nations match against Scotland.

She has won five caps in her rugby career to date.

Personal life 
Lewis attended Amman Valley Comprehensive School before moving to Cardiff Metropolitan University, where she studies sports performance analysis.

References

External links 
 

1999 births
Living people
Welsh female rugby union players
Rugby union wings
Rugby union players from Ammanford